"Ojalá" (Spanish for "hopefully") is a song by Argentine singer-songwriter María Becerra. It was written by Becerra and Big One and produced by the latter one. The song was released on 1 June 2022 as the lead single from her second studio album, La Nena de Argentina.

Background
On 29 May 2022, Becerra announced the release of "Ojalá" via her social media platforms with the release date and a behind the scenes from the music video. The singer also shared a pre save link for the song.

Becerra also shared a video through Instagram talking with producer Big One on how the making of "Ojalá" came to be, revealing how she had the main idea and melody for the song.

"Ojalá" was officially released on 1 June 2022 accompanied by its music video.

Commercial performance
In Argentina, the song had a 'Hot Shot Debut', debuting at number 3 on the Billboard Argentina Hot 100 during the tracking week of 11 June 2022. On its fifth week, the song would reach its peak at number 2 for three consecutive weeks. On the week of 22 October 2022, the song reached its peak and the top three for the first time at number 3. The song also reached the top 10 in Uruguay at number 6.

Music video
The music video for "Ojalá" was directed by Julián Levy and was released simultaneously with the song on 1 June 2022.

Charts

References

2022 singles
2022 songs
María Becerra songs
Spanish-language songs